Kaluu is a fictional character appearing in American comic books published by Marvel Comics.

Publication history

The character first appeared in the story "From the Nameless Nowhere Comes... Kaluu!" in Strange Tales #147 (Aug. 1966). The first five pages were written by Stan Lee, with Denny O'Neil writing the other half of the story (credited as "Our Vacationin' Sorcerer" and "Our Sorcerer's Apprentice", respectively), and Bill Everett provided all the art.

Fictional character biography
Kaluu was born over five hundred years ago in the mystic city of Kamar-Taj, a village in the Himalayan Mountains.  He and the Ancient One became fellow students of the mystic arts.

Varnae, the eldest of the true vampires, met with Kaluu and imparted to him knowledge from the primeval compendium of black magic known as the Darkhold. Subsequently, Kaluu set about to make himself ruler of Kamar-Taj.  While the Ancient One continued his studies, Kaluu used his sorcery to influence the minds of the people of Kamar-Taj.  Eventually, Kaluu and the Ancient One together cast a spell that eliminated disease, poverty, and suffering from Kamar-Taj and granted its people immortality. Shortly thereafter, the people of Kamar-Taj, responding to Kaluu's magical influence on their minds, crowned him as their king. For over a year Kaluu organized the men of Kamar-Taj into an army of conquest. Meanwhile, Kaluu slowly increased his mystic control over the minds of the people of Kamar-Taj so that they become little more than his placid puppets. The Ancient One attempted to warn the people of Kamar-Taj about Kaluu, but Kaluu's magic prevented them from heeding him. Kaluu struck the Ancient One with a magical bolt from behind which paralyzed him. Then Kaluu had his soldiers conquer a neighboring village and reduce it to slavery.

Using black magic to control the people of Kamar-Taj, he waged war against the Ancient One, but he summoned a pestilence that almost wiped out the entire population of Kamar-Taj and forced Kaluu to flee to the dimension of Raggador. He emerged from Raggador five centuries later and attempted to steal the Book of the Vishanti. He was defeated by Doctor Strange and hurled into another dimension in suspended animation.

The forces unleashed in a battle between Doctor Strange and Urthona eventually freed Kaluu from his imprisonment. When he returned from exile he became a businessman and amassed a large fortune. He formed an alliance with the embattled Doctor Strange, and tutored him in the practice of black magic. Alongside Strange, he battled Shuma-Gorath and various other ancient evils. He also witnessed Doctor Strange's defeat of Shuma-Gorath. Kaluu, Strange, Rintrah, and Enitharmon the Weaver, returned to the Earth dimension where he cast a spell to remove the physical and astral pollution from Strange caused by using black magic.

Kaluu plans to live a quiet, enjoyable life, while living off money he made by influencing the stock market.

He is seen communicating via crystal ball with the new Ronin (who was actually Blade posing as the "Spider Hero").

Kaluu later appears as a member of the Mighty Avengers.

Powers and abilities
Kaluu has the ability to manipulate magical forces for a vast number of effects, including levitation, teleportation, energy projection, conjuration of small physical objects, physical transformation of objects, and the tapping of extra-dimensional energy by invoking entities or objects of power existing in dimensions tangential to Earth's through the recitation of spells. He has used this skill to render himself immortal. He also has the powers of mesmerism, thought-casting, illusion-casting, and astral projection.

According to the back story of the character, Kaluu is possibly the most powerful living human black magician. Kaluu's magic derives not only from personal, universal and dimensional powers: he has powers gained through the tapping of the life forces of living beings and the manipulation of the environment in certain ways that have destructive side effects.

Kaluu has used mystical means to render himself immortal. He does not age, but he can be killed by external means.

Kaluu is a master of various Asian martial arts, but prefers not to engage in physical combat. He has extensively studied sorcery and possesses vast knowledge of black magical lore.

Kaluu formerly wore an eye-patch covering his left eye, though this eye has since been restored.

References

External links
 Kaluu at Marvel Wiki
 Kaluu at Comic Vine

Avengers (comics) characters
Characters created by Bill Everett
Characters created by Dennis O'Neil
Characters created by Stan Lee
Comics characters introduced in 1966
Fictional Tibetan people
Marvel Comics characters who use magic
Marvel Comics martial artists
Marvel Comics supervillains